Krištić is a patronymic surname found in Croatia, and may refer to:

 Miroslav Krištić (born 1990), Croatian footballer

See also
 Kristić
 Krstić

Croatian surnames
Patronymic surnames